Ulrich of Bamberg was a priest and chronicler who lived in Bamberg, Germany around 1100.

Biography
Born Udalricus Babenbergensis, he was a cleric of the cathedral church of Bamberg, of whom nothing more is known than that he lived about 1100 at Bamberg. He is probably identical with the priest of Bamberg of the same name (d. 7 July 1127), who is often mentioned in official documents and who bestowed large benefits on the monastery of Michelsberg.

Literary importance
Ulrich's work is called Codex epistolaris, continens variorum pontificum et imperatorum Romanorum, ut et S.R.E. cardinalium et S.R.I. principum e cclesiasticorum seculariumque epistolas. This collection of documents was completed in 1125 and dedicated to Bishop Gebhard of Würzburg. It contains letters from the year 900 on and was undoubtedly intended for the training of chancellors and statesmen, giving examples as models for the form of letters and public documents. Numerous important letters and charters of that period, which are preserved in it, offer rich material for the history of the relations between the emperors and popes; in particular the letters exchanged by Emperor Lothair, Henry the Proud, and Pope Innocent II give an animated and instructive picture of conditions at that time. These letters also show how the statesmen at the episcopal courts and probably also the bishops were trained. After the collection had been closed by Ulrich several supplements were added that extend to 1134; these additional documents are generally addressed to Bishop Otto of Bamberg.

See also
Bamberg Cathedral
Otto of Bamberg

References

Year of birth unknown
1127 deaths
12th-century German historians
People from Bamberg
German male non-fiction writers
Clergy from Bavaria
11th-century births